The 2014 Okinawa gubernatorial election was held on December 9, 2014.

Results
 
    
    
 
 

 

 
 1: supported by JCP, SDPJ, PLP and PLPO etc.
 2: supported by LDP and PFG
 3: supported by JIP and PGOR.
 4: expelled from the DPJ during the election campaign.

External links
Okinawa Prefecture Election Commission 

2014 elections in Japan
2014
December 2014 events in Japan